Tösen från Stormyrtorpet may refer to:

 The Lass from the Stormy Croft, a 1917 Swedish drama film
 Tösen från Stormyrtorpet (1947 film), a Swedish drama film

See also
 The Girl from the Marsh Croft (disambiguation)